Herman Paul Pressler III (born June 4, 1930), is a retired justice of the Texas 14th Circuit Court of Appeals in his native Houston, Texas. Pressler was a key figure in the conservative resurgence of the Southern Baptist Convention, which he initiated in 1979.

Political career
Judge Pressler is a past president of the Council for National Policy, which in 2009 presented him with its Ronald Reagan Award for Lifetime Achievement. In his 1999 memoir, A Hill on Which to Die: One Southern Baptist's Journey, Pressler recounts how he first met Reagan at a meeting in Dallas in 1980 of Ed McAteer's Religious Roundtable, a part of the newly organized Christian right groups:

At the urging of some friends, I decided to go [to the briefing in Dallas]. I did not expect much, but when I arrived, I found a packed arena, full of enthusiastic individuals hearing great speakers. I went to the phone after the first few hours, called Nancy [his wife], and said, 'Get a baby-sitter for the children. You must come up here and hear what is going on.' She flew to Dallas, and we had the opportunity to attend together. This was the first time either of us had met Ronald Reagan. [Dallas businesswoman] Mary Crowley invited us to a reception for him at the Hyatt. Jimmy Carter had been invited to speak but did not attend.

In 2011, Pressler received the William Wilberforce Award for Lifetime Achievement from the National Federation of Republican Assemblies, which also named him to its Board of Advisors in 2014.

Controversies 
In April 2018, the Houston Chronicle reported that Paul Pressler was accused by Toby Twining and Brooks Schott of sexual misconduct in separate court affidavits. Both men said Pressler molested or solicited them for sex. The accusations were filed as part of a lawsuit filed in 2017 by Gareld Duane Rollins Jr. claiming he was regularly raped by the conservative leader. Rollins met Pressler in high school and was part of a Bible study Pressler led. Rollins claims he was raped two to three times a month while at Pressler's home. According to the Chronicle, Pressler agreed in 2004 to pay $450,000 to Rollins for physical assault. Southern Baptist leader Paige Patterson is also named in the suit, for helping Pressler cover up the abuse.

In the 2018 Chronicle report, Toby Twining was a teenager in 1977 when Pressler grabbed his penis in a sauna at Houston's River Oaks Country Club. Pressler was a youth pastor at Bethel Church in Houston but was ousted in 1978 after church officials received information about "an alleged incident." Attorney Brooks Schott also stated in an affidavit that he resigned his position at Pressler's former law firm after Pressler invited him to get into a hot tub with him naked. Brooks also accused Jared Woodfill, Pressler's longtime law partner who from 2002 to 2014 was chairman of the Harris County Republican Party, of failing to prevent Pressler's sexual advances toward him and others claiming his indiscretions were well-known at the firm.

In May 2022, Guidepost Solutions released an independent report stating that Pressler is the defendant in a civil lawsuit alleging that he repeatedly abused the plaintiff beginning when the plaintiff was 14. Two other men have submitted affidavits accusing Pressler of sexual misconduct.

Anne Nelson's 2021 book, Shadow Network, alleges that Pressler successfully established minority control of the SBC.  He then convinced the senior Republican Party leadership to attempt the same practices to establish minority, one-party control of the United States federal government.

References

1930 births
American Christian religious leaders
American evangelicals
Baptists from Texas
Living people
People from Houston
Princeton University alumni
University of Texas School of Law alumni
Members of the Texas House of Representatives
Southern Baptists
Texas state court judges
Texas lawyers
Texas Democrats
Texas Republicans
People from Washington County, Texas
Ranchers from Texas
American non-fiction writers
Philanthropists from Texas